The Underdogs may refer to:

In literature:
 The Underdogs (novel) (Los de abajo), a novel by Mariano Azuela
 The Underdogs, a novel and adapted play by William Weintraub

In music:
 The Underdogs (production team), an American R&B/pop production duo
 The Underdogs (American band), a 1960s garage-rock band
 The Underdogs, a 1980s band from Leeds
 The Underdogs, a 1960s New Zealand band included on the compilation Golden Kiwis – The Hits Collection
 "The Underdogs", a song by Weezer from Raditude

See also
 Home of the Underdogs, an abandonware archive website
 Los de Abajo (disambiguation)
 Underdog (disambiguation)